Paths of Memory is a 2009 documentary film directed by José Luis Peñafuerte. The film won the 2011 Magritte Award for Best Documentary Film.

References

External links

Belgian documentary films
Spanish documentary films
2009 films
2000s Spanish-language films
Magritte Award winners
2000s Spanish films